Eleanor Holland (or Alianore Holland) may refer to:
 Lady Alianore Holland, Countess of March (1373–1405), daughter of Thomas Holland, 2nd Earl of Kent and Lady Alice Fitzalan
 Lady Eleanor Holland, Countess of Salisbury (1386–after 1413), younger full sister of Lady Alianore
 Eleanor de Holland (c. 1406–?), illegitimate daughter of Constance of York and Edmund Holland, 4th Earl of Kent